Trish Groe is a former member of the Arizona House of Representatives, serving from 2005 through 2009. A Republican, she was first elected to the House in November 2004, and was re-elected in 2006.

Groe pleaded guilty to Driving Under the Influence having been pulled over on March 22, 2007.  Since she had already been convicted of driving on a suspended license, she was sentenced to spend 10 days in jail and fined $2950.

She lost in the primary in 2008 to fellow incumbent Nancy McLain and Doris Goodale, both of whom went on to win in the general election.

References

Republican Party members of the Arizona House of Representatives
Women state legislators in Arizona
People from Waukegan, Illinois
People from Lake Havasu City, Arizona
21st-century American politicians
21st-century American women politicians
1969 births
Living people
Arizona politicians convicted of crimes